Jeff Coetzee and Chris Haggard were the defending champions but did not compete that year.

Bob Bryan and Mike Bryan won in the final 7–5, 6–3 against Arnaud Clément and Michaël Llodra.

Seeds

  Bob Bryan /  Mike Bryan (champions)
  Wayne Arthurs /  Paul Hanley (second round)
  Gastón Etlis /  Martín Rodríguez (second round)
  Wayne Black /  Kevin Ullyett (first round)

Draw

External links
 2004 AAPT Championships Doubles Draw

Next Generation Adelaide International
2004 ATP Tour
2004 in Australian tennis